Daniel Pavúk (born 19 March 1998) is a Slovak footballer who plays for Železiarne Podbrezová as a forward.

Club career

FK Železiarne Podbrezová
Pavúk made his professional debut for Železiarne Podbrezová against Nitra on 16 February 2019.

References

External links
 FK Železiarne Podbrezová official club profile 
 
 Futbalnet profile 
 

1998 births
Living people
Sportspeople from Prešov
Slovak footballers
Association football forwards
FK Pohronie players
FK Železiarne Podbrezová players
1. FC Tatran Prešov players
Slovak Super Liga players
2. Liga (Slovakia) players
3. Liga (Slovakia) players